Tiergartenbach is a small river of Bavaria, Germany. It is a right tributary of the Hafenlohr in Rothenbuch.

See also
List of rivers of Bavaria

Rivers of Bavaria
Rivers of Germany